Instant-off is a feature found in modern laptops, predominantly included in premium, high-end models only. Instant-off enables users of such devices to immediately power down their hardware without enduring the long and often arduous waiting process typically associated with laptops that are not Instant-off enabled. Whilst such a feature could technically be incorporated into inferior mainstream consumer models, the high cost and low level of user education associated with this market are prohibitive.

Benefits
The benefits of Instant-off are primarily concerned with the protection of information. For example, it is company policy at most Fortune 500 corporations that the CEO and other high ranking corporate officers use only laptops that are Instant-off enabled in order to protect commercially sensitive information in the event that someone attempts to observe the screen over the shoulder of the officer.

Implementation
Instant-off is usually implemented in devices following the principles of stealth. As such, the trigger for the Instant-off process will normally be hidden in a location without any distinguishing features to alert other users to its presence; the archetypal location for the trigger being the power cord of the laptop, with the removal of said power cord activating the Instant-off process and leading to the complete shutdown of the system within 1.5 seconds. Whilst locating the trigger in such an easily accessible component of the laptop does lead to occasional accidental activations, the benefits of hiding the feature in plain sight - which allows it to be activated within seconds of the alarm being raised - are generally thought to more than compensate for this one perceived drawback.

See also
 Information security
 Computer security

Laptops